The 2020–21 PWHPA season is the second season of the ongoing strike by the Professional Women's Hockey Players Association.

Formed after the collapse of the CWHL in 2019, the organisation consists of over 150 women's ice hockey players sitting out current leagues in North America. For the 2020–21 season, the PWHPA is organised into five different hubs, each of which fields a roster that will compete in exhibition games across North America and in the Dream Gap Tour tournament against each other.

Business   
On September 2, 2020, the PWHPA released a statement condemning police brutality and racial injustice. The same day, Liz Knox resigned from the PWHPA board in order to cede her seat to Sarah Nurse, one of the few Black players in the organization.

In August 2020, the PWHPA partnered with Elites Optimization Services to help players find individual sponsorships. After sponsoring a showcase the previous season, deodorant brand Secret agreed to a sponsorship deal with the PWHPA for $1 million on October 22, 2020, the largest corporate commitment in North American women's hockey history at the time. The sponsorship deal includes prize money for the Dream Gap Tour, planned to start in early 2021 with a minimum of six showcases. The organization also added partnerships with Noble Estates Wines & Spirits, Canadian Tire, and Sportlogiq.

On February 23, 2021, the PWHPA announced the February 28 game of the 2021 Dream Gap Tour, played at Madison Square Garden, would be aired live on the NHL Network in the United States and Sportsnet in Canada.

Teams  
Of the five regional hubs, three are in Canada: in Montréal, Toronto, and Calgary; and two are in the United States: New Hampshire and Minnesota. PWHPA players competed in try-outs for 25 spots on the official rosters for each hub. In late October, the PWHPA announced the full rosters for each hub as well as coaching staff. Players who did not make the rosters continue to be members of the PWHPA as independents.

In the previous season, each team was named after player who was acting as captain for each series. For this season, the regional hubs made sponsorship agreements for team names. The Toronto hub made a sponsorship deal with insurance company Sonnet and was branded as Team Sonnet with the hub's jerseys featuring turquoise and white. The Calgary hub was branded Team Scotiabank, with red and white jerseys, in a partnership with Scotiabank that includes a mentorship program for young female players. On February 25, 2021, before the tour's first games, the Minnesota and New Hampshire-based teams announced their sponsored names as Team Adidas and Team WSF (Women's Sports Foundation), respectively. The Montréal team was announced as Team Bauer on March 3.

Exhibition games    
The first exhibition games of the season took place in late September, as PWHPA teams faced off against teams from the United States Premier Hockey League (USPHL), an under-21 junior ice hockey organization. One week after tryouts, the New Hampshire team faced the Islanders Hockey Club's National Collegiate Development Conference (NCDC) team and the Boston Junior Bruins' NCDC team, losing to both 5–0 and 5–1, respectively. The Minnesota PWHPA team faced the USPHL's Premier Division team, the Minnesota Mullets, on September 19 and 20, winning both games by scores of 8–1 and 9–3.

A PWHPA All-Star team of 24 players from the Minnesota and New Hampshire hubs participated in six games at the USPHL's Hub City Tampa from January 7 to 15, 2021. The USPHL teams in Hub City Tampa were from the organization's top-level NCDC and second-level Premier Division. The PWHPA team earned a 2–3–1 record with wins over the Tampa Bay Juniors' Premier team and the Boston Junior Bruins' NCDC team. The PWHPA All-Star team played another five games against USPHL NCDC and Premier teams in Tampa from February 10 to 17, going 1–4 with a win over the Islanders Hockey Club's Premier team.

Dream Gap Tour  
The 2021 Dream Gap Tour, named after the gap in between professional men's and women's hockey opportunities, consists of matches between the five regional hubs and the entire tour is sponsored by deodorant brand Secret. In a change from the previous year, the league plans to have a season finishing with the Secret Cup for the championship. In an alteration to traditional ice hockey points for team wins, teams are awarded 2 points for a regulation win, 1.5 points for an overtime win, 1 point for a shootout win, 0.5 points for an overtime or shootout loss, and zero points for a regulation loss. In addition, one team point can be earned when a player scores a hat-trick, scores a short-handed goal, a goaltender earns a shutout, or a team scores five or more goals.

The first showcase took place in the New York City metropolitan area at Protec Ponds Training Center in Somerset, New Jersey, on February 27 and at Madison Square Garden on February 28, in partnership with the New York Rangers of the National Hockey League (NHL) and JPMorgan Chase as the presenting sponsor. The Chicago Blackhawks partnered with the PWHPA for a second year, adding Dream Gap Tour stops to the Blackhawks' home arena, the United Center, on March 6 and their practice facility, Fifth Third Arena, on March 7. The third showcase was announced for St. Louis, Missouri, partnered with the St. Louis Blues on April 11 and 12, but was postponed to May 16 and 17 after positive cases of COVID-19. The three Canadian teams are scheduled to play a round-robin tournament in Calgary in partnership with the Calgary Flames from May 24 through 30 to determine the Canadian champion. The association also continued its partnership with the NHL's Toronto Maple Leafs and was also to host part of the Dream Gap Tour at an unspecified date, but did not occur due to the ongoing pandemic-related restrictions in Ontario.

Schedule and results

See also   
2020–21 NWHL season

References

External links 
 PWHPA website

PWHPA
PWHPA
Women's ice hockey competitions in Canada
Women's ice hockey competitions in the United States
PWHPA